Higher education policy refers to education policy for higher education institutions such as universities, specifically how they are organised, funded, and operated in a society. According to Ansell (2006) there are "three different institutional forms of higher education provision: the Anglo-Saxon, Continental and the Scandinavian education system."

Anglo-Saxon education system

According to Ansell (2006), "[t]he Anglo-Saxon education system leads to a mass, partially private and publicly inexpensive system". The Anglo-Saxon system is sometimes described as an Anglo-American education system.

Continental education system 

According to Ansell (2006), "[t]he Continental educational system leads to an elite, fully public and inexpensive system".

Scandinavian education system 

According to Ansell (2006), "[t]he Scandinavian education system leads to a mass, fully public, but highly expensive system".

References

External links 
 Structure and Content of the American and European Models for Business Education
 Wars, Geopolitics, and University Governance in the Arab States

Higher education
Education policy